Dave Cottle is an American lacrosse coach. He is currently head coach of the Chesapeake Bayhawks of Major League Lacrosse and also a consultant for Marquette University, which announced it was adding men's and women's varsity lacrosse on December 16, 2010. He was previously the head coach for the Maryland Terrapins men's lacrosse team at the University of Maryland from 2002 to 2010. Cottle also coached the Loyola College men's lacrosse team from 1983 to 2001.

College career
Cottle attended Northern High School in his hometown of Baltimore, Maryland. He later enrolled at Salisbury State University in Salisbury, Maryland, where he played lacrosse from 1975 to 1978. During his playing career, he set numerous school and NCAA records. In his freshman season, 1975, Cottle led the nation in scoring, and became the second player in history to surpass 100 points in a season. He was named an All-American three years.

Coaching career

Loyola College
Cottle began his coaching career as a graduate assistant at Salisbury and then spent three years as the head coach at the Severn School, where he compiled a 26–9 record. In 1983, he took over as head coach at Loyola. In 1988, he led the Greyhounds to the NCAA tournament, and repeated the feat each subsequent season of his career at Loyola for a total of 14 appearances. Each of those years, the Greyhounds finished the season ranked in the top ten. In 1989, Cottle guided his team to become the only one in school history to finish the regular season undefeated. In 1990, Loyola advanced through the NCAA tournament to the final, before losing to Syracuse. The Greyhounds finished the 1994 season with an 11–2 record, one of their best in history, and recorded their first ever win over cross-town rival Johns Hopkins, 17–15. In 1999, Loyola under Cottle became the first team with a top seeding to not advance to the NCAA semifinals (Final Four).

Maryland
Cottle was hired as the head coach for the University of Maryland men's lacrosse team in September 2001. In his first season, 2002, the Terps finished 9–4 and did not qualify for the NCAA tournament. Beginning in 2003, Maryland made an appearance each subsequent season of Cottle's tenure. In 2003, the Terrapins appeared in the national tournament semifinals for the first time since 1998 and finished ranked number-three in the nation. The following season, Maryland won the Atlantic Coast Conference (ACC) championship for the first time since 1998. In 2005, Cottle led the Terps to a second consecutive ACC title. Maryland again made Final Four appearances in 2006 and 2007. In 2008, Maryland had an attacking corps composed entirely of freshman, but advanced to the NCAA quarterfinals before being eliminated by Virginia in an overtime game.

In 2010, Maryland earned the number-three seed in the NCAA tournament, and were strong favorites to reach the semifinals after number-two seed Syracuse was upset by Army in the first round. The Terrapins, however, were upset by Notre Dame in the second round. The following day, Cottle announced his resignation. Maryland athletic director Deborah Yow had earlier told Cottle that he was expected to reach the semifinals for a contract extension to be considered.

The Terrapins finished each of his nine seasons with a winning percentage of no less than 0.625. The team also has advanced to the NCAA tournament eight out of nine years. Cottle received criticism, however, due to his inability to lead his team to the NCAA finals. At the time, the Terrapins had not secured a national title since 1975, despite being the largest school in the state of Maryland, a traditional bastion of lacrosse talent. In 2001, some Maryland supporters had been critical of the athletic department's selection of Cottle over interim head coach Dave Slafkosky or former Syracuse star Gary Gait, who was an assistant for the Maryland women's team at the time.

Chesapeake Bayhawks
In July 2010, the Chesapeake Bayhawks of Major League Lacrosse hired Cottle as a consultant.

Marquette University
In December 2010, Marquette University in the Big East conference hired Cottle as a consultant.

Personal life
Cottle currently resides in Edgewater, Maryland Cottle is father to three daughters.

References

Year of birth missing (living people)
Living people
Maryland Terrapins men's lacrosse coaches
Salisbury Sea Gulls men's lacrosse players
Lacrosse players from Baltimore
Loyola Greyhounds men's lacrosse coaches
Chesapeake Bayhawks coaches